A car cooler is an automobile window-mounted evaporative air cooler, sometimes referred to as a swamp cooler. It is an early type of automobile air conditioner.

Technology 
To cool the air it used latent cooling of vaporization, in other words, cooling by water evaporation. Water inside the cooler evaporates and in the process transfers heat from the surrounding air to evaporate the water, giving in return cool moisture-laden air inside. The lower the humidity, the better it works. Because of the dry desert air,  they were popular in the southwestern United States states of California, Arizona, West Texas, New Mexico and Nevada.

The technology was an after-sale add-on product for cars and has been around since 1930. It was popular from the 1930s through to the 1960s. The basic unit looked like a canister-type vacuum cleaner. The car coolers were used on antique and classic cars from the Ford Model As to Hot Rods.

One model used balsa-wood shavings in a pad within the unit. The water from the container soaked the shavings and when air was forced through the unit the water would evaporate giving a cooling effect. The cool air would blow through a vent at a  right angle on the main unit into the passenger compartment.

There were several manufacturers of car coolers, examples being Thermador, Classic Aire, Sears Roebuck (Allstate brand), which also carried the Thermador brand, and Star Mfg. The car cooler came in different models from "ram-air" to "fan-powered" types. The "ram-air" type mounted on the passenger side window. It would only work when the car was in forward motion as the air was forced into the tube. The "fan-powered" model was designed to work when the car was not in motion or when moving at low speeds.

The car cooler is an outdated technology as refrigeration methods used today are more effective. However, there are manufacturers that still make car coolers for antique and classic cars.

Footnotes

References 
 Hinckley, Jim, The Big Book of Car Culture: The Armchair Guide to Automotive Americana, MotorBooks/MBI Publishing Company, 2005, 
 Sibley, His article in Popular Mechanics (May 1949) Air condition your car for summer driving

Automotive cooling systems
Cooling technology
Car windows